The men's 10,000 metres event at the 2020 Summer Olympics took place on 30 July 2021 at the Japan National Stadium. 25 athletes competed. None of the 2016 medalists took part in the competition. Selemon Barega from Ethiopia won the event, with Ugandans Joshua Cheptegei, the world record holder, and Jacob Kiplimo coming second and third, respectively. All of them won their first Olympic medal.

The medals for the competition were presented by Paul Tergat, Kenya; IOC Member, and the medalists' bouquets were presented by Lord Sebastian Coe, United Kingdom; World Athletics President.

Summary
25 athletes started and right from the gun, Ugandan Stephen Kissa went for the lead. No other athlete showed interest in the early breakaway, allowing Kissa to open up as much as a 70 metre gap on the field in the first mile. Employing team tactics similar to bicycle racing, the second Ugandan Jacob Kiplimo held the leading position on the pack while world record holder Joshua Cheptegei cruised along near the back of the pack. After 5 laps, Selemon Barega decided to pull in the breakaway, with Rhonex Kipruto tagging along for the chase. It took them three more laps to bridge the gap. As they reached contact with Kissa, Kissa accelerated again, opening up a smaller gap. With the peloton following the bridging duo, Barega fell back to the pack with Kipruto continuing to try to chase down Kissa. For the next 7 laps, Kipruto, would pull closer only to have Kissa open up another gap. Finally with 9 laps to go, Kipruto was able to get ahead of Kissa and open a gap of his own over the peloton as a whole. Once passed, Kissa fell back through the field and then walked off the track. Kipruto's gap on the field didn't hold more than two laps, but they continued to indulge him the leading position, pacing the field toward the chess match of the final laps. With just over four laps to go, Cheptegei decided it was time to take the lead. As they reached three laps, Rodgers Kwemoi challenged for the lead, with Mohammed Ahmed tucked behind the leaders, but still the pack had a dozen runners in contention with two laps to go. As a few fell off the back, Ahmed took the lead down the backstretch, but on the home stretch Barega came forward to lead at the bell. Barega opened up a small gap, chased by the more gangly sprinting of his Ethiopian teammate Berihu Aregawi, indoor mile world record holder Yomif Kejelcha, Kiplimo and Cheptegei. Kejelcha couldn't handle the speed, Ahmed fell back, leaving only the two Ugandans to chase the two Ethiopians. Through the final turn, Kiplimo worked his way past Aregawi. Coming off the turn, Cheptegei also got past and the chase was on down the home stretch. Cheptegei passed Kiplimo but Barega's five metre lead was too much to make up. Barega crossed the finish line with arms outstretched taking gold over the world record holder, his final lap 53.94.

Background
This was the 25th time the event is held, having appeared at every Olympics since 1912.

Qualification

A National Olympic Committee (NOC) could enter up to 3 qualified athletes in the men's 10,000 metres event if all athletes meet the entry standard or qualify by ranking during the qualifying period. (The limit of 3 has been in place since the 1930 Olympic Congress.) The qualifying standard is 27:28.00. This standard was "set for the sole purpose of qualifying athletes with exceptional performances unable to qualify through the IAAF World Rankings pathway." The world rankings, based on the average of the best five results for the athlete over the qualifying period and weighted by the importance of the meet, will then be used to qualify athletes until the cap of 27 is reached. Because more than 27 athletes (after applying the 3-per-NOC limit) have met the qualifying standard, the world rankings are not used.

The qualifying period was originally from 1 January 2019 to 29 June 2020. Due to the COVID-19 pandemic, the period was suspended from 6 April 2020 to 30 November 2020, with the end date extended to 29 June 2021. The qualifying time standards could be obtained in various meets during the given period that have the approval of the IAAF. Both indoor and outdoor meets were eligible for qualifying. The most recent Area Championships may be counted in the ranking, even if not during the qualifying period.

NOCs cannot use their universality place in the 10,000 metres.

Men's 10,000 m 

Entry number: initial target of 27. 30 runners qualified by Entry standard. 5 runners withdrew before the race.

Competition format

The event consists of a single race.

Records

Prior to this competition, the existing world and Olympic records were as follows.

Schedule

All times are Japan Standard Time (UTC+9)

The men's 10,000 metres took place on a single day.

Final

References

Men's 10,000 metres
2020
Men's events at the 2020 Summer Olympics